This is the discography of American record producer, Metro Boomin. It includes a list of songs produced, co-produced and remixed by year, artists, album and title.

Singles produced

2011

French Montana – Mister 16: Casino Life
01. Everything's A Go (produced with LongLivePrince)
12. Cadillac Doors (Me & U) (produced with LongLivePrince)

2013

Doe B – Baby Jesus
08. "Patrick Swayze"
12. "30 Piece"

Ludacris – #IDGAF
02. "If I Aint F'd Up"
03. "Raised In The South" (featuring Young Jeezy)
05. "9 Times Out OF 10" (featuring French Montana & Que)

DJ Esco – No Sleep
03. "Day One" (performed by Future featuring Yo Gotti) (produced with 808 Mafia)

2014

Ty Dolla $ign – $ign Language

Gucci Mane – East Atlanta Santa
12. "Riding Dirty"

Travis Scott – Days Before Rodeo
02. "Mamacita" (featuring Rich Homie Quan and Young Thug) 
06. "Skyfall" (featuring Young Thug)  
09. "Basement Freestyle" 
12. "BACC"

2015

Rich Homie Quan
01. "All Around the World" (produced with Zaytoven)

Yo Gotti – Concealed
06. "Ion Feel Em" (featuring Kevin Gates)
10. "Hero" (featuring Shy Glizzy)

Future – DS2 
01. "Thought It Was a Drought" 
02. "I Serve the Base"
03. "Where Ya At" (featuring Drake)
04. "Groupies" 
05. "Lil One" 
07. "Freak Hoe"
08. "Rotation" 
09. "Slave Master" 
10. "Blow a Bag" 
12. "Rich Sex" 
13. "Blood on the Money"

Travis Scott 
 00. High Fashion (featuring Future) (produced with Southside, Wondagurl, Eestbound, and Travi$ Scott)

Da$h – Skrewface
07. "Mudd Walk"

21 Savage - The Slaughter Tape 
 6. "Drip"

21 Savage - Slaughter King 
 10. "Deserve"

Travis Scott – Rodeo
01. "Pornography" 
03. "3500" (featuring Future and 2 Chainz) 
04. "Wasted" (featuring Juicy J) 
07. "Nightcrawler" (featuring Swae Lee and Chief Keef) 
15. "Ok Alright" (featuring Schoolboy Q)

Lil Durk - Remember My Name
02. "Amber Alert"

Uncle Murda and Future 
01. "Right Now"

Kourtney Money and Young Nudy - Paradise 2 East Atlanta 

 03. "Bitch Ass"

Bricc Baby Shitro – Nasty Dealer
02. "Nasty Dealer"
07. "IDK" (featuring Casey Veggies)
09. "Thru Wit It" (featuring Young Thug)

Pusha T - King Push – Darkest Before Dawn: The Prelude
01. "Intro" (produced with Sean "Puff Daddy" Combs and G Koop)

Chief Keef - Finally Rollin 2 
06. "Obama" 
17. "Jumanji" 
18. "Where Ya At"

2016

Uncle Murda 
01. "Right Now" (Remix)

Casino – Boss Man Casino 2
01. "Casino" (Featuring Santana)

King Monte Carlo 
01. "Colossal" (featuring Young Thug) (produced with Zaytoven)

Lil Uzi Vert - Lil Uzi Vert vs the World 

 05. "You Was Right"

21 Savage & Metro Boomin – Savage Mode
01. "No Advance" 
02. "No Heart" (produced with Southside and Cubeatz)
03. "X" (featuring Future) (produced with 21 savage)
04. "Savage Mode"
05. "Bad Guy" (produced with Sonny Digital)
06. "Real Nigga"
07. "Mad High" 
08. "Feel It" (produced with Zaytoven)
09. "Ocean Drive" (produced with Southside and G Koop)

Lil Uzi Vert – The Perfect LUV Tape 
09. "Ronda (Winners)"

Gucci Mane & Future – Free Bricks 2K16 (Zone 6 Edition)
03. "Die a Gangster" (co-produced with Southside)
05. "All Shooters" (co-produced with Southside)

Future - Evol 
 04. "Xanny Family"
 05. "Low Life feat. The Weeknd"

Hoodrich Pablo Juan - Designer Drugz 2 

 15. "Fish in the Coupe"

The Weeknd – Starboy 
 10. "Six Feet Under" (additional vocals from Future) (produced with Ben Billions, Doc McKinney, Cirkut, Eric Bledsoe and The Weeknd)

Kanye West - The Life of Pablo 
 2. “Father Stretch My  Hands Part 1” (produced by Metro Boomin, Mike Dean, and Rick Rubin)

Lil B
00. My House

Young Nudy - Slimeball 

 02. "Ain't Playin'"

Curren$y - Andretti 11/30 

 07. "Fed Ex" (Produced With Don Cannon)

2017

Shy Glizzy – The World Is Yours
02. "Errywhere"

Juicy J - Rubba Band Business
02. “Feed the Streets” (featuring Project Pat)
06. “Drop a Bag” (featuring G.O.D.)

Big Sean – I Decided.
 02. "Bounce Back" (Produced with Hitmaka, Smash David, and Amaire Johnson)
10. "Voices in My Head / Stick to the Plan" (Produced with DJ Dahi, DJ Khalil and Amaire Johnson)
13. "Sacrifices" (featuring Migos) (Produced with Allen Ritter)

Young Nudy - Slimeball 2 
 07. "Burn Ya"

Nephew Texas Boy – The Pack Landed At 8:08
01. "The Pack Landed @ 8:08" (Produced with TM88)

Beatking and Nephew Texas Boy – Texlanta 2
05. "Get Like Me" (Produced with TM88 and Sonny Digital)
12. "Ain't The Same"

Zach Farlow – Over Til It's Over
05. "Go F.A.R." (Produced with Southside)
06. "Round Here"

Future – Future
07. "Mask off" 
10. "Scrape"

Future – HNDRXX
01. "My Collection" (Produced with Cubeatz)
17. "Sorry" (Produced with Cubeatz)

Nav – Nav
06. "Up" (Produced with Nav)

Starlito – Manifest Destiny
01. "Too Much" (Produced with Doughboy Beatz)

Young Scooter – Jugg King
08. "Cook Up" (featuring Young Thug) (Produced with Zaytoven)

Block 125 – Quarter Key
04. "Lotta Money" (featuring Offset) (Produced with Zaytoven)

Hoodrich Pablo Juan and Drugrixh Peso – MONYPOWRSPT World Rules
07. "I Need 2"

Casino – Boss Man Casino 3
03. "Shut The F*ck Up" (featuring Quis)

Hoodrich Pablo Juan - Designer Drugz 3 
 09. "I Do This"

Lil Uzi Vert - Luv Is Rage 2 
 13. "X" (Produced with Pi'erre Bourne and Maaly Raw)

Gucci Mane
01. "Both" (featuring Drake & Lil Wayne) [Remix]

Post Malone
00. "Congratulations (Remix)" (featuring Quavo and Future)

Metro Boomin
00. "No Complaints" (featuring Offset and Drake)

21 Savage – Issa Album 
01. "Famous" 
02. "Bank Account" 
03. "Close My Eyes"
06. "Thug Life"
08. "Nothin New" 
09. "Numb"
11. "Money Convo"
13. "Whole Lot" (featuring Young Thug)
14. "7 Min Freestyle"

Lecrae – All Things Work Together
06. "Hammer Time" (featuring 1k Phew)

Gunna

 00. "Mind on a Milli" (featuring Hoodrich Pablo Juan) (Produced with Pi'erre Bourne and Wheezy)

21 Savage, Offset and Metro Boomin – Without Warning
01. "Ghostface Killers" (featuring Travis Scott)
02. "Rap Saved Me" (featuring Quavo)
03. "Ric Flair Drip" (Performed by Offset and Metro Boomin) 
04. "My Choppa Hate Niggas" (Performed by 21 Savage and Metro Boomin) 
05. "Nightmare" (Performed by Offset and Metro Boomin)
06. "Mad Stalkers" 
07. "Disrespectful"
08. "Run Up the Racks" (Performed by 21 Savage and Metro Boomin) 
09. "Still Serving" 
10. "Darth Vader"

Big Sean and Metro Boomin – Double Or Nothing
01. "Go Legend" (featuring Travis Scott)
02. "Big Bidness" (featuring 2 Chainz)
03. "Who's Stopping Me" 
04. "Pull Up N Wreck" (featuring 21 Savage) 
05. "So Good" (featuring Kash Doll)
06. "Savage Time" (additional vocals from Travis Scott)
07. "Even the Odds" (featuring Young Thug) (additional vocals from Gucci Mane)
08. "In Tune"
09. "Reason" (featuring Swae Lee) 
10. "No Hearts, No Love"

Nav and Metro Boomin - Perfect Timing 

01.	"Perfect Timing (Intro)" 
02.	"I Don't Care" 
03.	"Hit"	
04.	"ASAP Ferg" (featuring Lil Uzi Vert)	
05.	"Held Me Down" 	
06.	"Minute" (featuring Playboi Carti and Offset)	
07.	"Did You See Nav?" 
08.	"Bring It Back"	
09.	"Both Sides" (featuring 21 Savage)	
10.	"Call Me"	
11.	"You Know" (featuring Belly)
12.	"Rich"	
13.	"Need Some" (featuring Gucci Mane)	
14.	"I Am"	
15.	"NavUziMetro#Pt2" (featuring Lil Uzi Vert)

2018

Gunna – Drip Season 3
 01. "Helluva Price" 
07. "Pedestrian" 
10. "Car Sick" (featuring Nav and Metro Boomin) (Produced with Nav)
11. "My Soul" (Produced with London on da Track)
12. "No Joke"

Lil Jay Brown - Money Luvin Youngin: The Lick Tape 

 07. "Big Mad" (Produced with Southside)

DJ Esco - Kolorblind 

 03. "Chek" (featuring Future) (Produced with Dre Moon)

Rae Sremmurd – SR3MM 
 09. "T'd Up" (Produced with ChopsquadDJ)

Thompson Twins
00. "Hold Me Now (Metro Boomin Mix)"

Rich The Kid – The World Is Yours
08. "Lost It" (featuring Offset and Quavo)

Young Nudy - SlimeBall 3
13. "Right Now"

Nicki Minaj - Queen 

 09. "Chun Swae" (featuring Swae Lee)
 16. "Sir" (featuring Future) (Produced with Zaytoven)

Lil Wayne - Tha Carter V
22. "Used 2"

Belly - IMMIGRANT
06. "All for Me"

Lil Baby - Street Gossip
05. "Ready" (With Gunna)

Gucci Mane - Evil Genius
07. "Father's Day"

21 Savage - I Am > I Was
 02. "Break Da Law" (Produced with Doughboy & Southside)
09. "ASMR" (Produced with Kid Hazel)

2019

Offset - Father of 4

 01. "Father of 4" (featuring Big Rube)
 02. "How DId I Get Here" (featuring J. Cole) (Produced with Dre Moon)
 04. "Tats on My Face" (Produced with Southside, as SO ICEY BOYZ)
 06. "Wild Wild West" (featuring Gunna) (Produced with Allen Ritter)
 07. "North Star" (featuring Cee-Lo Green) (Produced with Allen Ritter)
 08. "After Dark" (Produced with Dre Moon and Allen Ritter)
 09. "Don't Lose Me" (Produced with Doughboy)
 10. "Underrated" (Produced with Southside, as SO ICEY BOYZ)
 13. "On Fleek" (featuring Quavo) (Produced with Zaytoven and Doughboy)
 14. "Quarter Milli" (featuring Gucci Mane) (Produced with Pyrex)
 15. "Red Room"

James Blake - Assume Form 

 02. "Mile High" (featuring Travis Scott and Metro Boomin) (Produced with Blake, Dre Moon, Dan Foat and Wavey)
 03. "Tell Them" (featuring Moses Sumney and Metro Boomin) (Produced with Blake, Allen Ritter, Dan Foat and Wavey)

Solange - When I Get Home 

 06. "Stay Flo" (Produced with Solange and John Carroll Kirby)

Lil Keed - Long Live Mexico 

 10. "Pass It Out" (featuring Lil Gotit)

Quality Control - Quality Control: Control the Streets, Volume 2 

 09. "Pink Toes" (With Offset and Dababy featuring Gunna) (Produced with Southside and Cubeatz) 
 11. "100 Racks" (With Offset featuring Playboi Carti) (Produced with Pi'erre Bourne)

Gucci Mane - Woptober II 

 13. "Break Bread" (Produced with Doughboy)

2020

The Weeknd - After Hours

06. "Escape from LA" (Produced with The Weeknd and Illangelo)
07. "Heartless" (Produced with The Weeknd and Illangelo; co-produced by Dre Moon)
08. "Faith" (Produced with The Weeknd and Illangelo)
14. "Until I Bleed Out" (Produced with Oneohtrix Point Never, Illangelo, Prince 85, The Weeknd, and Notinbed)

21 Savage & Metro Boomin – Savage Mode II
01. "Intro" (Produced with Prince 85)
02. "Runnin" 
03. "Glock in My Lap" (Produced with Southside and Honorable C.N.O.T.E.)
04. "Mr. Right Now" (featuring Drake) (Produced with David x Eli)
05. "Rich Nigga Shit" (featuring Young Thug) (Produced with Peter Lee Johnson)
06. "Slidin" (Produced with David x Eli and Allen Ritter)
07. "Many Men" (Produced with Johnson)
08. "Snitches & Rats (Interlude)" 
09. "Snitches & Rats" (featuring Young Nudy) (Produced with Johnson)
10. "My Dawg" (Produced with Kid Hazel)
11. "Steppin on Niggas" 
12. "Brand New Draco" (Produced with Johnson and Prince 85)
13. "No Opp Left Behind" 
14. "RIP Luv" (Produced with Zaytoven and Johnson)
15. "Said N Done"

Lil Durk - The Voice

07. "Stay Down" (With 6LACK and Young Thug)
(Produced with DY Krazy)

Young Nudy

01. "Vice City"

2021

Various Artists - Dutch (Original Motion Picture Soundtrack)
03. "Jiggy Lil Be" (Performed By Danileigh)

Various Artists - Gully (Original Motion Picture Soundtrack)
01. "Betrayed" (Performed By 21 Savage)

Drake - Certified Lover Boy
13. "Knife Talk" (Featuring 21 Savage and Project Pat)

Don Toliver - Life of a Don
07. "Swangin’ On Westheimer" (Produced with Mario Winans)
11. "Company, Pt. 2"

Young Thug - Punk
03. "Stupid/Asking"
18. "Love You More" (Featuring Nate Ruess, Gunna & Jeff Bhasker)

James Blake - Friends That Break Your Heart
07. "Foot Forward" (Produced with James Blake and Frank Dukes)

Coldplay - Music of the Spheres
05. "Let Somebody Go" (Featuring Selena Gomez)

Lil Gotit - Top Chef Gotit
14. "Grim Reaper"

Juice Wrld - Fighting Demons
01. "Burn"

Gucci Mane - So Icy Christmas
17. "Long Live Dolph"

2022

Gunna - DS4Ever
03. "poochie gown"
06. "P power" (Featuring Drake)
08. "alotta cake"

Notes

 This music was not included on the official track listing of Black Ken.

References

External links
 
 
 

Production discographies
Hip hop discographies
Discographies of American artists